The Barber of Seville is a 1958 Australian TV play.

See also
List of live television plays broadcast on Australian Broadcasting Corporation (1950s)

References

External links

The Barber of Seville at National Film and Sound Archive

Australian television plays
Australian television plays based on operas
1958 television plays
Films based on The Barber of Seville (play)